In armed conflicts, the civilian casualty ratio (also civilian death ratio, civilian-combatant ratio, etc.) is the ratio of civilian casualties to combatant casualties, or total casualties. The measurement can apply either to casualties inflicted by or to a particular belligerent, casualties inflicted in one aspect or arena of a conflict or to casualties in the conflict as a whole. Casualties usually refer to both dead and injured. In some calculations, deaths resulting from famine and epidemics are included.

Starting in the 1980s, it was often claimed that 90 percent of the victims of modern wars were civilians, repeated in academic publications as recently as 2014. These claims, though widely believed, are not supported by detailed examination of the evidence, particularly that relating to wars (such as those in former Yugoslavia and in Afghanistan) that are central to the claims. Some of the citations can be traced back to a 1991 monograph from Uppsala University which includes refugees and internally displaced persons as casualties. Other authors cite Ruth Leger Sivard's 1991 monograph in which the author states "In the decade of the 1980s, the proportion of civilian deaths jumped to 74 percent of the total and in 1990 it appears to have been close to 90 percent."

The most comprehensive examination of civilian war deaths throughout history is by William Eckhardt, in which Eckhardt states:

On the average, half of the deaths caused by war happened to civilians, only some of whom were killed by famine associated with war...The civilian percentage share of war-related deaths remained at about 50% from century to century. (p. 97)

Mexican Revolution (1910–20)
Although it is estimated that over 1 million people died in the Mexican Revolution, most died from disease and hunger as an indirect result of the war. Combat deaths are generally agreed to have totaled about 250,000. According to Eckhardt, these included 125,000 civilian deaths and 125,000 combatant deaths, creating a civilian-combatant death ratio of 1:1 among combat deaths.

World War I

Some 7 million combatants on both sides are estimated to have died during World War I, along with an estimated 10 million non-combatants, including 6.6 million civilians. The civilian casualty ratio in this estimate would be about 59%. Boris Urlanis notes a lack of data on civilian losses in the Ottoman Empire, but estimates 8.6 million military killed and dead and 6 million civilians killed and dead in the other warring countries. The civilian casualty ratio in this estimate would be about 42%. Most of the civilian fatalities were due to famine, typhus, or Spanish flu rather than combat action. The relatively low ratio of civilian casualties in this war is due to the fact that the front lines on the main battlefront, the Western Front, were static for most of the war, so that civilians were able to avoid the combat zones.

Chemical weapons were widely used by all sides during the conflict and wind frequently carried poison gas into nearby towns where civilians did not have access to gas masks or warning systems. An estimated 100,000-260,000 civilian casualties were affected by the use of chemical weapons during the conflict and tens of thousands more died from the effects of such weapons in the years after the conflict ended.

Germany suffered 750,000 civilian dead during and after the war due to famine caused by the Allied blockade. Russia and Turkey suffered civilian casualties in the millions in the Russian Civil War and invasion of Anatolia respectively. Armenia suffered up to 1.5 million civilians dead in the Armenian genocide.

World War II

According to most sources, World War II was the most lethal war in world history, with some 70 million killed in six years. The civilian to combatant fatality ratio in World War II lies somewhere between 3:2 and 2:1, or from 60% to 67%. The high ratio of civilian casualties in this war was due in part to the increasing effectiveness and lethality of strategic weapons which were used to target enemy industrial or population centers, and famines caused by economic disruption. An estimated 2.1–3 million Indians died in the Bengal famine of 1943 in India during World War II. A substantial number of civilians in this war were also deliberately killed by Axis Powers as a result of genocide such as the Holocaust or other ethnic cleansing campaigns.

Korean War
The median total estimated Korean civilian deaths in the Korean War is 2,730,000. The total estimated North Korean combatant deaths is 213,000 and the estimated Chinese combatant deaths is over 400,000. In addition to this the Republic of Korea combatant deaths is around 134,000 dead and the combatant deaths for the United Nations side is around 49,000 dead and missing (40,000 dead, 9,000 missing). The estimated total Korean war military dead is around 793,000 deaths. The civilian-combatant death ratio in the war is approximately 2:1 or 67%. One source estimates that 20% of the total population of North Korea perished in the war.

Vietnam War
The Vietnamese government has estimated the number of Vietnamese civilians killed in the Vietnam War at two million, and the number of NVA and Viet Cong killed at 1.1 million—estimates which approximate those of a number of other sources. This would give a civilian-combatant fatality ratio of approximately 2:1, or 67%. These figures do not include civilians killed in Cambodia and Laos. However, the lowest estimate of 411,000 civilians killed during the war (including civilians killed in Cambodia and Laos) would give a civilian-combatant fatality ratio of approximately 1:3, or 25%. Using the lowest estimate of Vietnamese military deaths, 400,000, the ratio is about 1:1.

Chechen wars
During the First Chechen War, 4,000 separatist fighters and 40,000 civilians are estimated to have died, giving a civilian-combatant ratio of 10:1. The numbers for the Second Chechen War are 3,000 fighters and 13,000 civilians, for a ratio of 43:10. The combined ratio for both wars is 76:10. Casualty numbers for the conflict are notoriously unreliable. The estimates of the civilian casualties during the First Chechen war range from 20,000 to 100,000, with remaining numbers being similarly unreliable. The tactics employed by Russian forces in both wars were heavily criticized by human rights groups, which accused them of indiscriminate bombing and shelling of civilian areas and other crimes.

NATO in Yugoslavia

In 1999, NATO intervened in the Kosovo War with a bombing campaign against Yugoslav forces, who were alleged to be conducting a campaign of ethnic cleansing. The bombing lasted about 2½ months, until forcing the withdrawal of the Yugoslav army from Kosovo.

Estimates for the number of casualties caused by the bombing vary widely depending on the source. NATO unofficially claimed a toll of 5,000 enemy combatants killed by the bombardment; the Yugoslav government, on the other hand, gave a figure of 638 of its security forces killed in Kosovo. Estimates for the civilian toll are similarly disparate. Human Rights Watch counted approximately 500 civilians killed by the bombing; the Yugoslav government estimated between 1,200 and 5,000.

If the NATO figures are to be believed, the bombings achieved a civilian to combatant kill ratio of about 1:10, on the Yugoslav government's figures, conversely, the ratio would be between 4:1 and 10:1. If the most conservative estimates from the sources cited above are used, the ratio was around 1:1.

According to military historian and Israeli Ambassador to the United States Michael Oren, for every Serbian soldier killed by NATO in 1999 (the period in which Operation Allied Force took place), four civilians died, a civilian to combatant casualty ratio of 4:1. Oren cites this figure as evidence that "even the most moral army can make mistakes, especially in dense urban warfare".

Afghanistan War

According to the Watson Institute for International and Public Affairs at Brown University, as of January 2015 roughly 92,000 people had been killed in the Afghanistan war, of which over 26,000 were civilians, for a civilian to combatant ratio of 0.4:1.

Iraq War

According to a 2010 assessment by John Sloboda of Iraq Body Count, a United Kingdom-based organization, American and Coalition forces had killed at least 28,736 combatants as well as 13,807 civilians in the Iraq War, indicating a civilian to combatant casualty ratio inflicted by coalition forces of 1:2. However, overall, figures by the Iraq Body Count from 20 March 2003 to 14 March 2013 indicate that of 174,000 casualties only 39,900 were combatants, resulting in a civilian casualty rate of 77%.

US drone strikes in Pakistan

The civilian casualty ratio for U.S. drone strikes in Pakistan is notoriously difficult to quantify. The U.S. itself puts the number of civilians killed from drone strikes in the last two years at no more than 20 to 30, a total that is far too low according to a spokesman for the NGO CIVIC. At the other extreme, Daniel L. Byman of the Brookings Institution suggests that drone strikes may kill "10 or so civilians" for every militant killed, which would represent a civilian to combatant casualty ratio of 10:1. Byman argues that civilian killings constitute a humanitarian tragedy and create dangerous political problems, including damage to the legitimacy of the Pakistani government and alienation of the Pakistani populace from America. An ongoing study by the New America Foundation finds non-militant casualty rates started high but have declined steeply over time, from about 60% (3 out of 5) in 2004–2007 to less than 2% (1 out of 50) in 2012. The study puts the overall non-militant casualty rate since 2004 at 15–16%, or a 1:5 ratio, out of a total of between 1,908 and 3,225 people killed in Pakistan by drone strikes since 2004.

Israeli–Palestinian conflict
Estimates of civilian casualties from the Israeli–Palestinian conflict differ. A 2007 report by the United Nations Office for the Coordination of Humanitarian Affairs (OCHA) found that, from the beginning of the second intifada in September 2000 until the end of July 2007, at least 5,848 people were killed in the conflict, over half of whom were civilians. Amongst those killed in that period, 69% of Israelis were civilians, while the report estimated 59% of Palestinian casualties were civilians.

In May 2012 B'Tselem decided to stop addressing the question of participation in combat, with respect to Palestinians killed in the West Bank, stating that, "while in the past there were complicated incidents in the West Bank that might have met the definition of "combat incidents," in recent years the incidents meeting that definition have been almost nil." B'Tselem does not address or count the number of Israelis killed or maimed by Palestinians or Palestinian forces. B'Tselem has also established a separate category for recording Palestinian police officers killed by Israel; according to B'Tselem, Israel counts the Gaza police force as a non-civilian when calculating the civilian casualty ratio, and states that such a definition is not compatible with the ICRC interpretation of international law. The International Committee of the Red Cross regards persons as civilians if they do not fulfill a "continuous combat function" (for example, many police officers) and do not participate directly in hostilities. Analysts state that in addition to their civilian roles such as policing traffic, police in Gaza are active in counter-intelligence and fighting dissent.

Israeli airstrikes on the Gaza Strip
The head of the Shin Bet reported to the Israeli Cabinet that of the 810 Palestinians killed in Gaza in 2006 and 2007, 200 were civilians (a ratio of approximately 1:3). Haaretz assessed this to be an underestimation of civilian casualties. Using figures from Israeli human rights organisation B'Tselem, they calculated that 816 Palestinians had been killed in Gaza during the two-year period, 360 of whom were civilians. Military journalist Amos Harel wrote in Haaretz that the ratio between military targets and civilians was 1:1 in 2002–2003, when half the casualties in air assaults on the Gaza Strip were civilians. He attributed this to an Israeli Air Force (IAF) practice of attacking militants even when they had deliberately located themselves in densely populated areas. The ratio improved to 1:28 ratio in late 2005, meaning one civilian killed for every 28 combatants. It lowered, however, to 1:10 in 2006. In 2007, the ratio was at its lowest ever, more than 1:30. Figures showing an improvement from 1:1 in 2002 to 1:30 in 2008 were also cited by The Jerusalem Post journalist Yaakov Katz. However, in operations in Gaza since 2008, the ratio again dropped, as low as 5:2 during the 2014 Israel–Gaza conflict.

On its web blog, the IDF stated that the IDF's civilian-to-terrorist death ratio is the lowest in the world. It says that civilian deaths are caused by the use of human shields by Gazan militant groups, such as Hamas. The IDF blog lists various counter-terrorism methods used by the IDF to minimize civilian casualties and lower the civilian casualty ratio, including pinpoint targeting, aborting strikes due to risk of civilian casualties, and smartbombs with the ability to cancel a strike whilst in midair.

Israel in the 2008–09 Gaza War

Several analysts have attempted to calculate the Israel Defense Forces's civilian casualty ratio in the 2008–09 Gaza War. All have noted that the ratio differs significantly depending on which figures are used regarding the total number of casualties and their identity. The main sets of figures are those published by the IDF, essentially corroborated by Hamas, the opposing belligerent in the conflict, on the one hand; and those published by B'Tselem on the other hand.  The final IDF report identified 709 militants out of a total of 1,161 Gaza fatalities, with another 162 whose status could not be confirmed (300 were ID'd as civilians). B'Tselem say 1,391 Palestinians were killed, of whom 759 of them did not take part in the hostilities while 350 did take part in the hostilities, 248 were police officers who were killed inside police stations, and it is not known if 32 who were killed did take part in the hostilities.

The Goldstone Report into the conflict concluded that while there were many individual Gaza policemen who were members of militant groups, the Gaza police forces were a civilian police force and "cannot be said to have been taking a direct part in hostilities and thus did not lose their civilian immunity from direct attack as civilians".

Journalist Yaakov Katz states in The Jerusalem Post that the ratio is 1:3 according to the Israeli figures and 60% civilians (3:2) according to B'Tselem's figures. Katz describes the IDF's civilian casualty ratio in the Gaza War and in the year preceding it as low.

Katz says that over 81 percent of the 5,000 missiles the IDF dropped in the Gaza Strip during the operation were smart bombs, a percentage which he states is unprecedented in modern warfare. Journalist and commentator Evelyn Gordon writes in Commentary that the civilian casualty ratio in the 2008–09 Gaza War was 39 percent (2:3), using however only the preliminary Israeli estimates, but that 56 or 74 percent were civilians according to B'Tselem's figures, depending on whether 248 Hamas policemen are considered combatants or civilians; and 65 or 83 percent according to the figures of the Palestinian Centre for Human Rights. Gordon says that all of these ratios, even if the worse were correct, are lower than the normal civilian-to-combatant wartime fatality ratio in wars elsewhere, as given by the Red Cross, and states that the comparison shows that the IDF was unusually successful at minimizing civilian casualties.

13 Israelis were killed during the conflict, including 10 IDF soldiers (4 killed by friendly fire), giving a civilian casualty ratio for Palestinian forces of 24% or 3:10.

Israel in the 2014 Gaza war

Reports of casualties in the 2014 Israel-Gaza conflict have been made available by a variety of sources. Most media accounts have used figures provided by the government in Gaza or non-governmental organizations. Differing methodologies have resulted in varied reports of both the overall death toll and the civilian casualty ratio.

According to the main estimates between 2,125 and 2,310 Gazans were killed and between 10,626 and 10,895 were wounded (including 3,374 children, of whom over 1,000 were left permanently disabled). 66 Israeli soldiers, 5 Israeli civilians (including one child) and one Thai civilian were killed and 469 IDF soldiers and 261 Israeli civilians were injured. The Gaza Health Ministry, UN and some human rights groups reported that 69–75% of the Palestinian casualties were civilians; Israeli officials estimated that around 50% of those killed were civilians., giving Israeli forces a ratio between 1:1 and 3:1 during the conflict.

In March 2015, OCHA reported that 2,220 Palestinians had been killed in the conflict, of whom 1,492 were civilians (551 children and 299 women), 605 militants and 123 of unknown status, giving Israeli forces a ratio of 5:2.

1982 Lebanon War
In 1982, Israel invaded Lebanon with the stated aim of driving the PLO away from its northern borders.  The war culminated in a seven-week-long Israeli naval, air and artillery bombardment of Lebanon's capital, Beirut, where the PLO had retreated. The bombardment eventually came to an end with an internationally brokered settlement in which the PLO forces were given safe passage to evacuate the country.

According to the International Red Cross, by the end of the first week of the war alone, some 10,000 people, including 2,000 combatants, had been killed, and 16,000 wounded—a civilian-combatant fatality ratio of 5:1. Lebanese government sources later estimated that by the end of the siege of Beirut, a total of about 18,000 had been killed, an estimated 85% of whom were civilians. This gives a civilian to military casualty ratio of about 6:1.

According to Richard A. Gabriel between 1,000 and 3,000 civilians were killed in the southern campaign. He states that an additional 4,000 to 5,000 civilians died from all actions of all sides during the siege of Beirut, and that some 2,000 Syrian soldiers were killed during the Lebanon campaign and a further 2,400 PLO guerillas were also killed. Of these, 1,000 PLO guerrillas were killed during the siege. According to Gabriel the ratio of civilian deaths to combatants during the siege was about 6 to 1 but this ratio includes civilian deaths from all actions of all sides.

See also
Casualty recording
Collateral damage
 Asymmetric warfare
 Fourth generation warfare
 Loss exchange ratio
 Just war
 Distinction (law)
 Proportionality (law)
 Military necessity

Notes

References

 Anstrom, Jan; Duyvesteyn, Isabelle (2004): Rethinking the Nature of War, pp. 72-80, Routledge, .
 Deane, Hugh (1999): The Korean War: 1945-1953, p. 149, China Books & Periodicals, .
 Hartley, Cathy et al (2004): Survey of Arab-Israeli Relations, p. 91, Routledge, .
 Larson, Eric V. (2007): Misfortunes of War: Press and Public Reactions to Civilian Deaths in Wartime, pp. 65, 71, RAND Corp., .
 Layoun, Mary N. et al (2001): Wedded to the Land? Gender, Boundaries, & Nationalism in Crisis, p. 134, Duke University Press, .
 Mattar, Philip: (2005): Encyclopedia Of The Palestinians, p. 47, Facts on File, .
 Sadowski, Yahya M. (1998): The Myth of Global Chaos, p. 134, Brookings Institution Press, .
 Snow, Donald M. (1996): Uncivil Wars: International Security and the New Internal Conflicts, pp. 64-66, Lynne Rienner Publishers, .

Further reading

Ratios
War
War on terror